Maarten van Regteren Altena (born January 22, 1943) is a Dutch composer and contrabassist.
Altena attended the Conservatorium van Amsterdam (he studied contrabass) and graduated in 1968. Between 1980 and 1985, he studied composition with Robert Heppener.

Career

Altena first recorded with Theo Loevendie, after which he had the opportunity to be part of Marion Brown's trio that recorded Porto Novo along with Han Bennink. After graduation, Altena played in a number of ensembles, such as various formations around Willem Breuker and Theo Loevendie. He also played in the Dutch Ballet Orchestra and other orchestras. In the mid-1970s he started performing solo, playing his own pieces, partly composed, partly improvised.

Altena also founded his own ensemble, the Maarten Altena Kwartet (Maarten Altena Quartet) which expanded into the Maarten Altena Ensemble (MAE) in 1980. From that point onwards, his career focused on composition. In 1997 he stopped being an active member of this ensemble, and he left it completely in 2005 in order to be able to spend more time composing for other ensembles.

Compositions
 First Floor (1989) for the Netherlands Wind Ensemble
 Speaking (1990) for the Nieuwe Slagwerkgroep Amsterdam
 Pitch (1990) for the Mondriaan Kwartet
 Stave (1988) for tenor saxophonist Peter van Bergen
 Toonzucht (1991) for singer Jannie Pranger
 Puls (1993) for percussionist Johan Faber.
 Secret instructions (1992) for the Nederlands Studenten Orkest
 Code, (1992) of which Henk van der Meulen made a film for the NPS
 Zijdelings Afgesproken (1996) for the Maarten Altena Ensemble and Maatschappij Discordia
 Mijlpaal er trilt iets (1998), music theater based on a text by Remco Campert for Theatergroep Hollandia
 Een geestelijk verschiet / Horizon (1999)
 Eluard/Beckett (2000) for the Maarten Altena Ensemble
 Album (2001) for clarinetist David Kweksilber
 Mouthpiece II for the Netherlands Wind Ensemble
 La Dolce Ferita (Torquato Tasso) (2002) for the vocal Kassiopeia-kwintet and the Maarten Altena Ensemble
 Der tolle Mensch (Nietzsche) (2003) for the Netherlands Wind Ensemble
 arrangement of the Kindertotenlieder of Gustav Mahler for 15 instruments for the Netherlands Wind Ensemble
 Dans for the Maarten Altena Ensemble

Prizes
In 1978 Altena received the Wessel Ilcken Prize for jazz and improvised music.

References

External links
 
  on Donemus
 

1943 births
Living people
Dutch composers
Dutch jazz double-bassists
Conservatorium van Amsterdam alumni
Musicians from Amsterdam
21st-century double-bassists